Holligan is a surname. Notable people with the surname include:

Andy Holligan (born 1967), British boxer
Gavin Holligan (born 1980), British soccer player and musician
Hadan Holligan (born 1995), Barbadian association footballer
Joe Holligan (1886–1915), Australian rules footballer
John Holligan (1875–1939), Australian rules footballer 
Leslie Holligan (1978–2007), Guyanese soccer player
Mick Holligan (1881–1948), Australian rules footballer
Philip Holligan (1898–1986), British World War I flying ace
Teddy Holligan (1878–1964), Australian rules footballer